Since the first printing of Carl Linnaeus's Species Plantarum in 1753, plants have been assigned one epithet or name for their species and one name for their genus, a grouping of related species. Many of these plants are listed in Stearn's Dictionary of Plant Names for Gardeners. William Stearn (1911–2001) was one of the pre-eminent British botanists of the 20th century: a Librarian of the Royal Horticultural Society, a president of the Linnean Society and the original drafter of the International Code of Nomenclature for Cultivated Plants.

The first column below contains seed-bearing genera from Stearn and other sources as listed, excluding those names that no longer appear in more modern works, such as Plants of the World by Maarten J. M. Christenhusz (lead author), Michael F. Fay and Mark W. Chase. Plants of the World is also used for the family and order classification for each genus. The second column gives a meaning or derivation of the word, such as a language of origin. The last two columns indicate additional citations. 

Key 
 
Latin: = derived from Latin (otherwise Greek, except as noted)
Ba = listed in Ross Bayton's The Gardener's Botanical
Bu = listed in Lotte Burkhardt's Index of Eponymic Plant Names
CS = listed in both Allen Coombes's The A to Z of Plant Names and Stearn's Dictionary of Plant Names for Gardeners
G = listed in David Gledhill's The Names of Plants
St = listed in Stearn's Dictionary of Plant Names for Gardeners

Genera

See also

 Glossary of botanical terms
 List of Greek and Latin roots in English
 List of Latin and Greek words commonly used in systematic names
 List of plant genera named for people: A–C,  D–J,  K–P, Q–Z
 List of plant family names with etymologies

Notes

Citations

References
 
   See http://creativecommons.org/licenses/by/4.0/ for license.

Further reading 

 
  Available online at the Perseus Digital Library.
  Available online at the Perseus Digital Library.
 

Systematic
Greek words and phrases
Systematic
Systematic
Taxonomy (biology)
Plant genus names with etymologies (A-C)
Gardening lists
Genus names with etymologies (A–C)
Etymologies,A
Wikipedia glossaries using tables